Long Island Alliance for Peaceful Alternatives is a non-profit organization founded in 1985 to provide educational programs on peace and national security issues and to promote dialogue on the role and responsibility of citizens in determining national priorities and policies. The organization is located in Garden City, New York.

See also
List of anti-war organizations
List of peace activists

External links
Long Island Alliance for Peaceful Alternatives Official site

Peace organizations based in the United States
Garden City, New York
1985 establishments in New York (state)
Organizations established in 1985